The 2020–21 Handball-Bundesliga was the 56th season of the Handball-Bundesliga, Germany's premier handball league and the 44th season consisting of only one league. Due to the COVID-19 pandemic, the league announced 1 October 2020 as the start date and the season ended on 27 June 2021.

As there were no relegated teams last season, this season is being played with 20 teams.

THW Kiel won their twenty-second overall and second consecutive title.

Teams

Team changes

Stadiums

Standings

Results

Top goalscorers

Notes

References

External links
Official website

Handball-Bundesliga
2020–21 domestic handball leagues
2020 in German sport
2021 in German sport